Richard James Barr (November 28, 1865 – June 11, 1951) was an American politician and lawyer.

Biography
Born in Wilton Center, Will County, Illinois, Barr went to University of Illinois and then received his law degree from University of Michigan Law School. He was admitted to the Illinois bar and practiced law in Joliet, Illinois. He served as Joliet city attorney and was mayor of Joliet. From 1903 until 1951, Barr served in the Illinois State Senate and was a Republican. In the 1903 Joliet mayoral election, Democratic candidate William C. Crollus defeated Barr's reelection effort. Barr died in a hospital in Joliet, Illinois. His son William G. Barr also served in the Illinois General Assembly.

References

1865 births
1951 deaths
People from Will County, Illinois
University of Illinois Urbana-Champaign alumni
University of Michigan Law School alumni
Illinois lawyers
Mayors of Joliet, Illinois
Republican Party Illinois state senators